(pronounced SAHN-koh-fah) is a word in the Twi language of Ghana meaning “to retrieve" (literally "go back and get";  - to return;  - to go;  - to fetch, to seek and take) and also refers to the Bono Adinkra symbol represented either with a stylized heart shape or by a bird with its head turned backwards while its feet face forward carrying a precious egg in its mouth. Sankofa is often associated with the proverb, “Se wo were fi na wosankofa a yenkyi," which translates as: "It is not wrong to go back for that which you have forgotten." 

The sankofa bird appears frequently in traditional Akan art, and has also been adopted as an important symbol in an African-American and African Diaspora context to represent the need to reflect on the past to build a successful future. It is one of the most widely dispersed adinkra symbols, appearing in modern jewelry, tattoos, and clothing.

Akan symbolism

The Akan people of Ghana use an adinkra symbol to represent the same concept. One version of it is similar to the eastern symbol of a heart, and another is that of a bird with its head turned backwards to symbolically capture an egg depicted above its back. It symbolizes taking from the past what is good and bringing it into the present in order to make positive progress through the benevolent use of knowledge. Adinkra symbols are used by the Akan people to express proverbs and other philosophical ideas.

The sankofa bird also appears on carved wooden Akan stools, in Akan goldweights, on some ruler's state umbrella or parasol (ntuatire) finials and on the staff finials of some court linguists. It functions to foster mutual respect and unity in tradition.

Use in North America and the United Kingdom 

During a building excavation in Lower Manhattan in 1991, a cemetery for free and enslaved Africans was discovered.  Over 400 remains were identified, but one coffin in particular stood out. Nailed into its wooden lid were iron tacks, 51 of which formed an enigmatic, heart-shaped design that some have interpreted as a sankofa symbol.  The site is now a national monument, known as the African Burial Ground National Monument, administered by the National Park Service. A copy of the design found on the coffin lid is prominently carved onto a large black granite memorial at the center of the site.

The National Museum of African American History and Culture uses the heart-shaped symbol on its website. The "mouse over" for the image reads: "The Sankofa represents the importance of learning from the past."

Sankofa symbols show themselves all over cities like Washington, DC and New Orleans, particularly in fence designs.

Janet Jackson has a sankofa tattoo on her inner right wrist. The symbol is also featured in her 1997 album The Velvet Rope, as well as on the supporting tour.

Sankofa is an event used by Saint Louis University to honor African-American student graduates and students who graduate with degrees in African American studies.

The symbol and name were used in the 1993 film Sankofa by Haile Gerima, as well as in the graphic title of the film 500 Years Later by Owen 'Alik Shahadah.

A UK stage production by Adzido Pan-African Dance Ensemble, scripted by Margaret Busby and premiered in 1999, was entitled Sankofa.

The African-American string band Sankofa Strings, founded in 2005 by Sule Greg C. Wilson, Rhiannon Giddens, and Dom Flemons, was featured in the 2007 jug band documentary Chasin' Gus' Ghost. The band self-released the CD Colored Aristocracy in 2006.  A second iteration of the band Sankofa, with Wilson and Flemons, as well as Ndidi Onukwulu and Allison Russell, released the CD The Uptown Strut in 2012.

Cassandra Wilson recorded the song "Sankofa", which appeared on her 1993 album Blue Light 'til Dawn.

A Sankofa bird appears several times in the BBC Television show Taboo. It was carved into the floor of a slave ship by James Keziah Delaney and appears as a tattoo on his upper back and as a drawing within the fireplace of his mother’s old room.

The protagonist in Remote Control by Nnedi Okorafor goes by the name Sankofa

References 
 W. Bruce Willis, The Adinkra Dictionary: A visual primer on the language of Adinkra, Pyramid Complex (1998),

Notes

Akan culture
Ghanaian culture
Akan language
Symbols
West Africa